Single stage may refer to:

 Single stage game, a non-repeated extensive form game
 Single-stage-to-orbit, a vehicle which reaches orbit from the surface of a body without jettisoning hardware
 Single-stage transistor amplifier, a negative feedback amplifier
Single-stage incubation method, a method of incubation of eggs